Sira is a village in Flekkefjord municipality in Agder county, Norway. The village is located immediately east of the county border of Agder and Rogaland. The European route E39 highway passes by the village and the Sørlandet Line runs right through the village, stopping at Sira Station.

Sira lies along the Sira River, just south of the lake Sirdalsvatnet. The river and lake are both a part of the Sira-Kvina hydropower system. Sira was the administrative centre of the former municipality of Bakke which was dissolved and merged into Flekkefjord in 1965. Bakke Church lies at the southern end of the village.

References

Villages in Agder
Flekkefjord